The 2014 Winchester City Council election took place on 22 May 2014 to elect members of Winchester City Council in England. This was on the same day as other local elections.

After the election, the composition of Winchester City Council was:
Conservative 28
Liberal Democrat 25
Labour 3
Independent 1

Election results

Ward Results

Bishop's Waltham

Colden Common and Twyford

Cheriton & Bishop's Sutton

Denmead

Droxford, Soberton, Hambledon

Kings Worthy

Oliver's Battery and Badger Farm

Owslebury and Curdridge

Shedfield

Sparsholt

St Barnabas

St Bartholomew

St John and AllSaints

St Luke

St Michael

St Paul

Swanmore & Newton

The Alresfords

Wonston & Micheldever

References

2014 English local elections
2014
2010s in Hampshire